Graphocraerus is a genus of leafhoppers in the family Cicadellidae. There are at least two described species in Graphocraerus.

Species
These two species belong to the genus Graphocraerus:
 Graphocraerus montanus Dlabola 1994 c g
 Graphocraerus ventralis Fallén, 1806 c g b
Data sources: i = ITIS, c = Catalogue of Life, g = GBIF, b = Bugguide.net

References

Further reading

External links

 

Cicadellidae genera
Athysanini